Richard Dalton (born 27 August 1979) is an Irish-born, Canadian sprint canoeist. He has won three bronze medals at the ICF Canoe Sprint World Championships (C-1 200 m: 2010 - tied with Ukraine's Yuriy Cheban, C-1 1000 m: 2005, C-2 1000 m: 2002).

He also won a C-2 silver medal at the 2000 world marathon championships in Dartmouth, Nova Scotia. The distance at a marathon event varies between 36 and 40 km.
 
Dalton competed at the 2004 Summer Olympics in Athens, earning sixth place in both the C-1 500 m and C-1 1000 m events.

References

Sports-reference.com profile

1979 births
Canadian male canoeists
Canoeists at the 2004 Summer Olympics
Canoeists at the 2011 Pan American Games
Irish emigrants to Canada
Living people
Olympic canoeists of Canada
Sportspeople from Nova Scotia
Sportspeople from County Cork
ICF Canoe Sprint World Championships medalists in Canadian
Pan American Games gold medalists for Canada
Pan American Games medalists in canoeing
Medalists at the 2011 Pan American Games